RGIT may refer to":
Rajiv Gandhi Institute of Technology (disambiguation)
Robert Gordon's Institute of Technology, the former name of The Robert Gordon University,
Representative of German Industry and Trade